Ronald Rey Quispe Misme (born 5 March 1988) is a Bolivian race-walker competing for Bolivia at the 2016 Summer Olympics in the men's 50 km walk event. He finished in 30th place with a time of 4:02:00.

References 

1988 births
Bolivian male racewalkers
Living people
Athletes (track and field) at the 2016 Summer Olympics
Olympic athletes of Bolivia
Athletes (track and field) at the 2018 South American Games
South American Games bronze medalists for Bolivia
South American Games medalists in athletics
Athletes (track and field) at the 2019 Pan American Games
Pan American Games competitors for Bolivia